Panji may refer to:

Geography
 Panji District (潘集区), Huainan, Anhui, China
 Panji Town (潘集镇), a town in Panji District
 Panji (subdistrict), Situbondo Regency, East Java, Indonesia
 Way Panji, South Lampung Regency, Lampung, Indonesia

Entertainment
 Panji tales, a cycle of Javanese folk stories
 Panji Koming, an Indonesian cartoon appearing in Kompas
 Panji Manusia Millenium, an Indonesian soap opera

Other uses
 Panjis or Panji Prabandh, genealogical records maintained among Maithil Brahmins and Karna Kayasthas of Mithila region of north Bihar, India
 Raden Panji, a Javanese title used by noblemen from Pasuruan Regency
 Panjika or Panji, a Hindu astronomical almanac

See also 
 Panaji, or Panjim, a city in Goa, India
 Bikash Panji, Indian football player
 João Panji, East Timor football player